Robinsons Pangasinan (formerly Robinsons Place Pangasinan) is a shopping mall located on a  site on McArthur Highway, Calasiao, Pangasinan, Philippines. The mall opened on March 15, 2012.

The mall
Robinsons Place Pangasinan provides convenient access for pedestrians via its main central landscape and provide a dedicated vehicular access. There are also parking areas and drop-off points with canopies within the building's periphery to allow easy access to the mall.

The mall facade carries a design of curved-shaped crown details as the main accent. The shopping center interiors focus on geometric shapes and straight lines. Large atriums provide a relaxing ambiance for shoppers. It has been designed with environment-friendly features. Large hallways and high ceilings in the mall allow more air space and natural day light. A sewage treatment plant for proper discharge of waste water or for recycled water will also be built. Rain water collectors will also be installed.

In January 2016, the Department of Foreign Affairs inaugurated its twenty-first passport office at the mall's second level with former President Fidel V. Ramos in attendance. It has a room named in honor of the former president's father Narciso Ramos, a Pangasinense who once served as foreign affairs secretary.

References

Shopping malls in Pangasinan
Robinsons Malls
Shopping malls established in 2012